Gustav Lindh, (born 4 June 1995) is a Swedish actor. He is best known for his roles as Aron in Älska mig and Jörgen Olsson in Jordskott. He is internationally best known for his role in Queen of Hearts. In 2020, he plays a role in the Viaplay film Orca.

In 2022, he played the character Thorir the Proud in The Northman.

Filmography
2015 – The Circle
2016–2017 – Jordskott (TV-series)
2016 – Beck – episode "Steinar"
2016 – Springfloden
2017 – Vilken jävla cirkus
2018 – Maria Wern - Viskningar i vinden (TV-series)
2018 – Sthlm Rekviem (TV-series)
2018 – De dagar som blommorna blommar (TV-series)
2019 – Älska mig (TV-serie) (TV-series)
2019 – Queen of Hearts
2020 – Top Dog (TV-serie) (TV-series)
2020 - Björnstad (TV-series)
2020 - Orca
2020 - Riders of Justice
2022 - The Northman
2022 - Bränn alla mina brev

References

External links

Living people
21st-century Swedish male actors
1995 births